Sven-Axel Carlsson (1932–1971) was a Swedish film actor. He began his screen career as a child actor in the 1940s. Many of his final film performances came in the Åsa-Nisse series.

Selected filmography
 Bill Bergson, Master Detective (1947)
 The Key and the Ring (1947)
 This Can't Happen Here (1950)
 The Motor Cavaliers (1950)
 Fiancée for Hire (1950)
 Skipper in Stormy Weather (1951)
 She Came Like the Wind (1952)
 Say It with Flowers (1952)
 U-Boat 39 (1952)
 Speed Fever (1953)
 The Glass Mountain (1953)
 En karl i köket (1954)
 Dance in the Smoke (1954)
 The Vicious Breed (1954)
 Paradise (1955)
 Voyage in the Night (1955)
 Suss gott (1956)
 The Stranger from the Sky (1956)
 Night Light (1957)
 The Jazz Boy (1958)
 Crime in Paradise (1959)
 Heaven and Pancake (1959)
 Åsa-Nisse slår till (1965)
 Åsa-Nisse i raketform (1966)
 Åsa-Nisse i agentform (1967)
 Åsa-Nisse och den stora kalabaliken (1968)
 Åsa-Nisse i rekordform (1969)

References

Bibliography
 Vermilye, Jerry. Ingmar Bergman: His Life and Films. McFarland, 2015.

External links

1932 births
1971 deaths
Swedish male film actors
Male actors from Stockholm